The Smokey Bear Show is an American-Japanese animated television series that aired on ABC's Saturday morning schedule, produced by Rankin/Bass Productions. The show features Smokey Bear, the icon of the United States Forest Service, who was well known for his 1947 slogan, "Remember... only YOU can prevent forest fires". It aired for one season of 17 episodes starting on September 6, 1969, and then aired in reruns for the 1970–1971 season.

The Smokey Bear Show was based on stories created for the Dell Comics Smokey the Bear comic books, which were published as part of Dell's Four Color anthology series from 1955 to 1961. The comic featured anthropomorphic animals acting out fables of carelessness and greed, including a story about two bears who are Communist spies, and another about two cynical weasels who want to feed a baby bird to a bobcat in order to sell pictures of the "tragedy" to a magazine. The series adapted the comic's tales for the show, but toned down some of the morbid content. It did not garner high ratings.

American broadcaster and voice-over artist Jackson Weaver performed the voice for the adult Smokey; the cub Smokey was voiced by Canadian actress Billie Mae Richards. Other voices were provided by Carl Banas and Paul Soles. The series' animation was outsourced to Japanese studio Toei Doga (now known as Toei Animation), who were also responsible for their overseas animation work on The King Kong Show (its international co-production with Rankin/Bass) in 1966, The Wacky World of Mother Goose in 1967, and the Thanksgiving special The Mouse on the Mayflower in 1968.

Previously, Rankin/Bass produced a General Electric Fantasy Hour television special for NBC in 1966, The Ballad of Smokey the Bear, which featured their trademark stop-motion animation called "Animagic".

While the character is often referred to in popular culture as "Smokey the Bear" (including in the Dell Comics series), the correct name is "Smokey Bear", which is reflected in the cartoon's title and the spinoff Gold Key Comics series.

Opening
The theme song tells a brief summary of the bear's history: he was saved as a cub from a forest fire in New Mexico by a ranger, who named him Smokey and brought him to Washington, D.C. There, he became a ranger, and we see him don a ranger hat and grab his trusty shovel as he grows to a full size, adult bear. Traveling through the city in a parade, he heads for the woods with an important job to do.

This reflects the true story of a real bear cub who was rescued from the May 1950 Capitan Gap Fire in New Mexico. That cub was named Smokey after the already existing ad campaign, which began in 1944. New Mexico Department of Game and Fish Ranger Ray Bell and his family adopted the cub, and nursed him back to health, with the help of a veterinarian. The story was picked up by the national news service, and upon regaining his health, the bear was taken to the National Zoo in Washington and designated the "living symbol" of Smokey Bear.

Description
Each episode contains three cartoons: two featuring Smokey as an adult bear, with the middle cartoon showing Smokey in his cub days titled "Smokey Bear's Album."

Smokey lives in the forest with his neighbors: Floyd the fox, Benny the rabbit, Bessie the pig, Hiram the snake, Mayor Owl, Freddy Fume, the skunk, Smokey's cousin Griz, and Gabby the mountain lion. He often has to remind his friends about the principles of fire safety, and the show also stresses other conservation themes.

Comic books
As a tie-in for the cartoon, Gold Key Comics published another Smokey Bear comic book series, this time a quarterly beginning with an issue dated February 1970. 13 issues were published, ending in March 1973. In these stories, Smokey was aided by a coyote deputy named Clem. His TV show friends Bessie Pig, Benny Bunny and Mayor Owl appeared in the comic, along with Mr. and Mrs. Grizzly, Luke and Seth Coyote, Floyd Fox, Mayor Owl's niece Olivia, Lionel Lion and Sammy Skunk.

Cast
The voice cast included:
 Jackson Weaver as Smokey the Bear (adult)
 Billie Mae Richards as Smokey the Bear (cub), Bessie Boar, Additional voices 
 Carl Banas as Mayor Owl, Gabby the Cougar, Floyd the Fox, Freddy Fume, Additional voices 
 Paul Soles as Benny the Rabbit, Hiram the Snake, O. Otter, Additional voices

Crew
 Producers/Directors: Arthur Rankin, Jr., Jules Bass
 Script Editor: William J. Keenan
 Writers: Shamus Culhane, Frank Freda, Hal Hackady, Fred Halliday, Romeo Muller, William J. Keenan
 Music and Lyrics: Maury Laws, Jules Bass
 Recording Supervisor: Bernard Cowan
 Character Designer: Rod Willis
 Animation Supervisor: Steve Nakagawa
 Editorial Supervision: Irwin Goldress
 Sound Engineers: Stephen Frohock, Gene Coleman, Robert Brown

Episode list

 Founder's Day Folly
 Old Club House
 One Born Every Second
 The Outlaws
 Silliest Show on Earth
 Mission Improbable
 Running Wild
 Spooksville
 Saga of Gas Bag
 Hare Versus Cougar
 High Divin'
 Spit 'N Polish
 Mighty Minerva
 Casanova Hare
 Great Kite Contest
 Bessie Paints the Town
 Thar She Blows
 Hobo Jackal
 Sneaky Beaky
 Heroes Are Born
 Winter and Still Champ
 Freddy's Big Date
 Gone Fishin'
 An Apple a Day Keeps
 The Not So Merry Mailman
 An Ill Wind
 The Baby Sitters
 The Fire Fighter's Convention
 End of the World
 Hizzoner the Admiral
 Invention Is the Mother of Necessity
 Ancient Caleb Coyote
 Haunted Castle
 The Honorable Freddy Fume
 Gold Medal Grizzly
 Treasure Hunt
 Leave It to Grizzly
 Citizen Fume
 Invisible Benny
 The Battle of Penny Echo River
 Grizzly Rides Again
 Build a Better Bridge
 Feudin, Fightin' And Fussin'
 Stick 'Em Up
 Goal Line Grizzly
 The Crabtrees Forever
 Hare of a Thousand Faces
 Whar Fer Art Thou
 The Celebrity
 Ice Frolics
 The Hambone Heist

References

Rankin/Bass Productions television series
1960s American animated television series
1970s American animated television series
1969 American television series debuts
1971 American television series endings
American children's animated adventure television series
Animated television series about bears
English-language television shows